Tadiyawan, also spelled Tandiyawan, is a village and corresponding community development block in Hardoi district of Uttar Pradesh, India. Located 14 km from the city of Hardoi, it hosts a regular market and hosts a Deviji festival on Chaitra Sudi 8 dedicated to worship of the goddess Devi. The village has two primary schools but no healthcare facilities. As of 2011, the population of Tadiyawan is 5,998, in 1,079 households.

Demographic history 
The 1961 census recorded Tadiyawan as comprising 4 hamlets, with a total population of 2,078 (1,132 male and 946 female), in 463 households and 378 physical houses. The area of the village was given as 1,371 acres. Average attendance of the Deviji fair was listed as about 600 people at the time.

The 1981 census recorded Tadiyawan as having a population of 2,866, in 563 households, and covering an area of 565.37 hectares.

Villages 
Tadiyawan CD block has the following 88 villages:

References 

Villages in Hardoi district